is a Japanese politician of the Democratic Party of Japan, a member of the House of Representatives in the Diet (national legislature).

Overviews 

A native of Kitakyūshū and graduate of Hitotsubashi University, he joined the Ministry of Foreign Affairs in 1980, receiving a master's degree from Princeton University while in the ministry. Leaving the ministry in 1994, he was elected to the House of Representatives for the first time in 1996.

References

External links 
  in Japanese.

1956 births
Living people
People from Kitakyushu
Hitotsubashi University alumni
Constitutional Democratic Party of Japan politicians
Democratic Party of Japan politicians
Members of the House of Representatives from Tokyo
21st-century Japanese politicians